Yeh Ken-chuang (31 July 1932 – 23 July 2014) was a Taiwanese master carpenter, woodcarver, and expert in traditional Taiwanese architecture from Magong. He was known as "Master Chuang" within the carpentry community in Taiwan.

Yeh specialized in large traditional wooden architectural structures, including temples and other buildings. His notable works included the Long Men Kuanyin Temple and the Wang An Wu Fu Temple, both located in the Penghu Islands. In 2010, the government of Penghu County certified Yeh as a preservationist of traditional timber framing techniques. He was scheduled to be named as a candidate for "Living National Treasure" of Taiwan on 22 July 2014, at the time of his death.

He died in the TransAsia Airways Flight 222 plane crash at Magong Airport on 23 July 2014 at the age of 82. President Ma Ying-jeou announced that the Bureau of Cultural Heritage would preserve Yeh's records and documents on his timber framing techniques.

References

2014 deaths
Taiwanese carpenters
Taiwanese architects
Taiwanese woodcarvers
Taiwanese people of Hoklo descent
People from Penghu County
1932 births
Victims of aviation accidents or incidents in Taiwan